Antal Róth (born 14 September 1960 in Komló) is a retired Hungarian footballer who was active as a defender. Roth made his professional debut at Pécsi Munkas and also played for Feyenoord Rotterdam. After four seasons at Feyenoord he was forced to end his professional career due to a heavy injury.

He then became a manager.

References

 Profile

1960 births
Living people
Hungarian people of German descent
Hungarian footballers
Association football defenders
Feyenoord players
Eredivisie players
Hungary international footballers
1986 FIFA World Cup players
Hungarian expatriate footballers
Expatriate footballers in the Netherlands
Hungarian expatriate sportspeople in the Netherlands
Hungarian football managers
Szombathelyi Haladás football managers
Pécsi MFC managers
People from Komló
Nemzeti Bajnokság I managers
Sportspeople from Baranya County